Abstract is an album by Jamaican saxophonist Joe Harriott, recorded in England in November 1961 and May 1962, and released on the Columbia (UK) label in February 1963. It was released by Capitol Records in the United States.

Reception

Abstract was the first album by a British jazz group to be awarded five stars in a Down Beat review.

Allmusic awarded the album 4 stars and in its review by Thom Jurek, he states "Abstract is wonderful; it shows that the Brits were taking the new jazz of the early '60s and placing a spin on it because they had a few players like Joe Harriott. Here is a musician deserving of a wide reappraisal. Let's hope he gets it".

Track listing
All compositions by Joe Harriott except "Subject", by Joe Harriott and John Mayer; "Oleo," by Sonny Rollins.
 "Subject" - 5:58   
 "Shadows" - 5:44   
 "Oleo" - 7:06   
 "Modal" - 4:44   
 "Tonal" - 5:08   
 "Pictures" - 5:06   
 "Idioms" - 6:26   
 "Compound" - 5:04  
Recorded in London, England on November 22, 1961 (tracks 5-8) and May 10, 1962 (tracks 1-4)

Personnel
Joe Harriott - alto saxophone
Shake Keane - trumpet
Pat Smythe - piano
Coleridge Goode - bass
Bobby Orr (tracks 1-4), Phil Seamen (tracks 5-8) - drums  
Frank Holder - bongos (tracks 5 & 8)

References 

Capitol Records albums
Joe Harriott albums
1963 albums